Ludhiana district is one of the 23 districts in the Indian state of Punjab. It is Punjab's largest district by both area and population. Ludhiana, the largest city in Punjab, is the district headquarters.

The main industries are bicycle parts and hosiery. Ludhiana is a hub of ladies footwear manufacturing small scale units around 10000 units. Ludhiana is the largest city in the state. The district is made up of seven tehsils, seven sub-tehsils and twelve development blocks.

Ludhiana district has the highest HDI in Punjab at 0.761 (2004 UNDP).

History

Ludhiana gets its name from the Lodhi Dynasty, which is believed to have founded the city in 1480. During the reign of the Mughal emperor Akbar the area formed part of the Sarkar of Sirhind. Chakar, Talwandi Rai in 1478 AD, Raikot in 1648 AD and Jagraon in 1688 AD were founded by the Raj family of Raikot.

In the latter period of Mughal rule the western part of the district was leased to the Rais of Raikot. By the early eighteenth century, they had become semi-independent of the Mughals. The villages in Ludhiana district remained independent and under the rule of local powerful village Sikh chieftains, from 1707 to 1835. In 1747 Ahmad Shah Durrani invaded and battled the imperial army near Khanna. Although the Mughals were able to stop Ahmad Shah, his subsequent invasions weakened the Mughals, which allowed the Rais to take control of Ludhiana town in 1760.

During the reign of Maharaja Ranjit Singh, Ludhiana became an important British cantonment.  Initially, in 1805, Ranjit Singh occupied Ludhiana. However, in 1809, the British decided to curb his advance eastward and sent troops to confront him. Ranjit Singh was forced to sign the treaty of 'perpetual friendship' with the British, which confined his activities to the right bank of the Sutlej. British troops were permanently stationed in Ludhiana and the Cis-Sutlej states came under British protection.

According to the 1901 census, Hindus numbered 269,076, or 40% of the total; Muslims, 235,937, or 35%; and Sikhs, 164,919, or 24%. In 1947 due to violence and strife between the communities, most of the Muslim population left for Pakistan.

Geography
Ludhiana is a centrally located city of Punjab, which is on the Grand Trunk Road from Delhi to Amritsar at latitude 30.55 North and longitude 75.54 East in Northern India.

Ludhiana is the most centrally located district in the Malwa region of the state of Punjab. For administrative purposes, it has been placed in the Patiala Division. It lies between north latitude 30°-34' and 31°-01' and east longitude 75°-18' and 76°-20'.

It is bounded on the north by the Satluj River, which separates it from Jalandhar district. The river forms its northern boundary with Hoshiarpur district. On other sides it shares common boundaries with Rupnagar district in the east, Moga district in the west, and Barnala, Sangrur and Patiala districts in the south and southeast, respectively.

Topography
The topography of the district is a typical representative of an alluvial plain. It owes its origin to the aggravation work of the Satluj River. The alluvium deposited by the river has been worked over by the wind, which gave rise to a number of small dunes and sand mounds. Most of these dunes have been leveled by farmers.

The district can be divided into the flood plain of the Satluj and the upland plain.

Climate
Ludhiana features a semi-arid climate under the Köppen climate classification, with three defined seasons; summer, monsoon, and winter. This climate is characterized by dryness except for a brief spell of monsoon season, a very hot summer, and a bracing winter. The cold season is from mid-November to the early part of March. The succeeding period until the end of June is the hot season. July, August and half of September constitute the southwest monsoon. The period of mid-September to about the middle of November may be termed as a post-monsoon or transitional period.

June is generally the hottest month. Hot and scorching dust-laden winds blow during the summer season. December and January are the coldest months. The official weather station for the city is in the compound of the Civil Surgeon's Office to the west of Ludhiana. Weather records here data back to 1 August 1868.

Rainfall
The rainfall in the district increases from the southwest toward the northeast. About 70% of the rainfall is received during the period of July through September. The rainfall between December and March accounts for 16% of the rainfall; the remaining 14% rainfall is received in the other months.

Pollution
Ludhiana has one of the worst air pollution problems in India, with particulate matter being over six times the World Health Organization recommended standard, making it the 13th most polluted city in the world in the year 2014. Industrial water pollution is also of significant concern in portions of Ludhiana, notably along the Budha Dariya.

Rivers and drains
The Sutlej and its tributary, the Buddha Nala, constitute the chief hydrographic features of the district. A brief description of these is as follows.

 Sutlej River originates from Lake Manasarovar in Tibet. After flowing through Himachal Pradesh, it debouches from the Shivaliks. Just about Rupnagar, 32 km east of the boundary of Samrala Tehsil, it flows due west along the top of the district for 96 km and turns, as it leaves Jagraon Tehsil, slightly north toward its junction with the Beas at Harike. It maintains an east-west direction. It can be devastating during floods. The Sutlej has experienced a westward drift during recent times. Old towns and villages, such as Bahlulpur, Machhiwara, and Kum Kalan, were built on its banks. The river has since been dammed at Bhakhra, which has considerably checked its flooding menace in the district.

 Buddha Nala It runs parallel to the Satluj on its south for a fairly large section of its course in the district and ultimately joins the Satluj at Gorsian Kadar Baksh in the northwestern corner of the district. It floods during the rainy season, but in the dry season, it can be crossed on foot at certain points. Ludhiana and Machhiwara are to the south of the Buddha Nala. The water of the stream is polluted after it enters Ludhiana City.

Demographics 

According to the 2011 census, Ludhiana district has a population of 3,498,739 roughly equal to the nation of Panama or the US state of Connecticut. Ludhiana district has a total of 2,560,225 literates which constitutes 73.5% of the population, of which male literary is 76.5% and female literacy is 69.4%. The effective literacy of 7+ population of Ludhiana district is 82.20%, of which male is 86% and female literacy is 77.9%. The sex ratio of 873 females for every 1,000 males. The total Scheduled Caste population is 923,358 (26.39%). There were 716826 households in the district in 2011.

The number of workers in the district is 1285,000, which means a work participation rate of 36.7%. Out of the total workforce of the district, 18.7% are engaged in the agriculture sector, 5.6% are working in the household industry, and the rest are employed in other sectors/industries.

Religion

Language

At the time of the 2011 census 79.65% of the population spoke Punjabi and 18.19% Hindi as their first language. Hindi is spoken mainly in urban areas.

Government and politics

Politics
The district is a part of the Ludhiana Lok Sabha constituency. Ravneet Singh Bittu from Congress is the MP since 2019. Following is a list of the assembly constituencies in the district.

MLAs

Administrative divisions
For the administrative purpose, Ludhiana district is divided into seven tehsils, which are: -
 Jagraon
 Khanna
 Ludhiana (East)
 Ludhiana (West)
 Payal
 Raikot
 Samrala

Ludhiana West Tehsil is a tehsil in Ludhiana district. It has 125 villages.

Ludhiana East Tehsil is a tehsil in Ludhiana district. It has 181 villages.

Also, there are seven sub-tehsils in Ludhiana district: -
 Dehlon
 Koom Kalan
 Ludhiana Central
 Machhiwara
 Maloud
 Mullanpur Dakha
 Sidhwan Bet

Places of interest

References

External links 

 Official website

 
Districts of Punjab, India